Route 255 is a north/south highway on the south shore of the St. Lawrence River. Its northern terminus is in Baie-du-Febvre at the junction of Route 132 and its southern terminus is in Bury at the junction of Quebec Route 214.

List of towns along Route 255
 Baie-du-Febvre
 Saint-Zephirin-de-Courval
 Saint-Joachim-de-Courval
 Saint-Cyrille-de-Wendover
 Saint-Lucien
 Saint-Felix-de-Kingsey
 Danville
 Val-des-Sources
 Wotton
 Sainte-Camille
 Bishopton
 Bury

See also
 List of Quebec provincial highways

References

External links 
 Route 255 on Google Maps
 Provincial Route Map (Courtesy of the Quebec Ministry of Transportation) 

255